Malilla may refer to:

 Målilla, a Swedish settlement
 Malilla (card game), a popular Mexican card game